This article covers the second series of the MegaMan NT Warrior anime series titled MegaMan NT Warrior Axess, known in Japan as . Unlike the original EXE series, Axess has only one part, with 51 episodes. In the English version, only 45 episodes aired in the United States with an additional episode airing in Canada. The last 6 episodes were premiered a few weeks after the airing of the 46th.

Axess premiered in Japan on October 4, 2003 and ran until September 25, 2004. There would be no future breaks in between new Rockman series (unlike the six-month separation between the original EXE and Axess). The English version first aired in the United States when Kids' WB ran "sneak peek" airings of the first episode in November 2004 (and again in December). The series officially began its run on February 28, 2005. Like the original EXE, Kids' WB aired many episodes sporadically and out-of-order. After airing 35 episodes (having skipped one that aired in Canada), the show was suddenly taken off the air after episode 22 aired on September 10, 2005. About three months later, ten more episodes aired between November 28 and December 9, bringing the series to a close and skipping five more episodes.

Axess was meant to promote the Japanese release of Mega Man Battle Network 4 and prominently features characters and concepts from this game. However, it also uses many of the Mega Man Battle Network video games as source material for the almost entirely original plot (including obscure characters from Transmission). The series is also known for having a much darker tone, more violent battles, and a much less constant cast of characters (for example, EXE regulars Dex and Yai are reduced to guest appearances).



Episode list

References

2003 Japanese television seasons
2004 Japanese television seasons
Axess